Felice de Massimi (1501–1573) was a Roman Catholic prelate who served as Bishop of Città Ducale (1525–1573).

Biography
Felice de Massimi was born in 1501.
On 7 April 1525, he was appointed during the papacy of Pope Clement VII as Bishop of Città Ducale.
He served as Bishop of Città Ducale until his death in 1573.

References

External links and additional sources
 (for Chronology of Bishops) 
 (for Chronology of Bishops) 

16th-century Italian Roman Catholic bishops
Bishops appointed by Pope Clement VII
1501 births
1573 deaths